Ioan "Ionuț" Angelo Lupescu (born 9 December 1968) is a Romanian former football player who played as a midfielder and a manager.

Club career
Ioan Lupescu, nicknamed Kaiserul was born on 9 December 1968 in Bucharest, Romania and started to play football in 1975 at the youth of Austrian club, Admira Wacker, the club where his father, Nicolae played until his retirement. When his family returned to Romania, he went to play for Rapid București, being rejected after a trial, but after his family moved from Grivița to the Pantelimon neighborhood he went to play for junior squad of the team his father was senior coach, Mecanică Fină București, but after a while at the pressure of his mother who wanted to see him play for a bigger team he went at Dinamo București's youth center where he worked with Iosif Varga. On 21 September 1986 at age 17, he made his Divizia A debut under coach Mircea Lucescu in a 4–1 home victory against SC Bacău, also Lucescu gave him the captain armband at age 19. The highlights of his period spent with The Red Dogs were the quarter-finals reached in the 1988–89 European Cup Winners' Cup where they were eliminated on the away goals rule after 1–1 on aggregate by Sampdoria and in the following season the club won the title and the cup with Lupescu playing 29 Divizia A matches with four goals scored, also appearing in 6 matches in which he scored one goal in the 1989–90 European Cup Winners' Cup where Dinamo reached the semi-finals where they were eliminated after 2–0 on aggregate by Anderlecht. After the 1989 Romanian Revolution, Lupescu had offers to play in Italy from Bologna and Mircea Lucescu's team, Pisa, but he chose to make his own path in football, going to play in Germany for Bayer Leverkusen where he made his Bundesliga debut on 11 August 1990 when he was sent by coach Jürgen Gelsdorf in the 68th minute in order to replace Marcus Feinbier in a 1–1 against Bayern Munich, but the biggest performances achieved during his 6 seasons spent at the club were under coach Dragoslav Stepanović which consisted of the triumph in the 1992–93 DFB-Pokal and the reaching of the 1994–95 UEFA Cup semi-finals with Lupescu making 10 appearances in the campaign. In 1996 he went to play for two seasons at fellow Bundesliga team, Borussia Mönchengladbach, afterwards returning in Romania at Dinamo where in the 1999–00 season he helped the club win The Double, being used by coach Cornel Dinu in 29 Divizia A matches in which he scored six goals. In 2000, Lupescu went to play in Turkey only for a half of season in which he was also the team's captain, after which he paid his termination clause of 225.000$ in order to come back at Dinamo, helping the team win at the end of the season the 2000–01 Cupa României. He started the 2001–02 season at Dinamo, but in October 2001, he signed a contract with Saudi Arabia club Al-Hilal, working with Portuguese coach Artur Jorge, but could not adapt, because of the high climate, leaving the club in January 2002, however at the end of the season, both clubs won the title. Ioan Lupescu has a total of 227 matches and 10 goals scored in Bundesliga, 183 matches and 25 goals scored in Divizia A, 9 games with two goals scored in Süper Lig, 5 appearances and one goal scored in Saudi Premier League and 46 games played with 3 goals scored in European competitions (including 2 appearances and one goal in the Intertoto Cup).

International career
Ioan Lupescu made 74 appearances for Romania and scored six goals, making his debut on 3 February 1988 when coach Emerich Jenei sent him on the field in the 81st minute in order to replace Ioan Sabău in a friendly which ended with a 2–0 victory against Israel. He played one match at the successful 1990 World Cup qualifiers, being used by coach Emerich Jenei in three matches from the final tournament, including in the game from the eight-finals where the team got eliminated by Ireland. He played 8 games and scored one goal at the Euro 1992 qualifiers, made 9 appearances and scored 3 goals at the successful 1994 World Cup qualifiers, being part of the "Golden Generation" that passed the group stage, eliminated with a 3–2 victory Argentina in the eight-finals, being eliminated after the penalty shoot-out by Sweden in the quarter-finals of the final tournament, being used by coach Anghel Iordănescu as a starter in all five games. He played 9 games at the successful Euro 1996 qualifiers, being used by coach Anghel Iordănescu in all the minutes of the 1–0 loss against France, as a starter, but replaced at half-time by Constantin Gâlcă in the 1–0 loss against Bulgaria and introduced in the 86th minute in order to replace Daniel Prodan in the 2–1 loss against Spain, as Romania did not pass the group stage. He played two games at the successful 1998 World Cup qualifiers, however he was not part of the squad that went to play at the final tournament and went on to play 9 games at the successful Euro 2000 qualifiers, being used by coach Emerich Jenei at the final tournament in the group game which ended 1–1 against Germany when he replaced Viorel Moldovan in the 85th minute and in the quarter-final against Italy which ended with a 2–0 loss when he replaced Constantin Gâlcă in the 68th minute. Ioan Lupescu's last game played for the national team took part on 7 October 2000 in a 3–0 away loss against Italy at the 2002 World Cup qualifiers.

On 25 March 2008 Lupescu was decorated by President of Romania Traian Băsescu for contributing as general manager of the Romanian Football Federation at the national team's successful Euro 2008 qualifying campaign with the Medalia "Meritul Sportiv" – (The Medal "The Sportive Merit") class III.

International goals
Scores and results list Romania's goal tally first, score column indicates score after each Lupescu goal.

Coaching career
In 2003, Lupescu acquired his coaching license at the German Sport University of Cologne. He started to work as a manager in the second part of the 2003–04 Divizia A season, helping FCM Bacău avoid relegation. In the following season he worked at FC Brașov in Divizia A but left the club after refusing to participate at a fixed match against Gloria Bistrița, insisting in front of the club's leader, Romeo Pașcu to play the game fairly, promising that he will leave the club if he loses, Pașcu accepted the deal, but the game was lost with 3–1, so Lupescu resigned, shortly afterwards being named general manager at the Romanian Football Federation by president Mircea Sandu, years later working as a technical director at UEFA and became a member of FIFA's Technical and Development Committee.

Personal life
Lupescu is the son of former Romanian national player Nicolae Lupescu, who for a time also served as a manager.

Honours
Dinamo București
Divizia A: 1989–90, 1999–00, 2001–02
Cupa României: 1989–90, 1999–2000, 2000–01
Bayer Leverkusen
DFB-Pokal: 1992–93
Al-Hilal
Saudi Premier League: 2001–02

References

External links

1968 births
Living people
Romanian footballers
Association football midfielders
Romania international footballers
Footballers from Bucharest
FC Dinamo București players
Bayer 04 Leverkusen players
Borussia Mönchengladbach players
Bursaspor footballers
Al Hilal SFC players
Bundesliga players
Liga I players
Süper Lig players
Saudi Professional League players
1990 FIFA World Cup players
1994 FIFA World Cup players
UEFA Euro 1996 players
UEFA Euro 2000 players
Romanian football managers
FC Brașov (1936) managers
FCM Bacău managers
Romanian expatriate footballers
Romanian expatriate sportspeople in Germany
Expatriate footballers in Germany
Romanian expatriate sportspeople in Turkey
Expatriate footballers in Turkey
Romanian expatriate sportspeople in Saudi Arabia
Expatriate footballers in Saudi Arabia